Olmones was a village in ancient Boeotia, situated 12 stadia to the left of Copae, and 7 stadia from Hyettus. It derived its name from Olmus, the son of Sisyphus, but contained nothing worthy of notice in the time of Pausanias (2nd century).

Its site is located north of Pavlon near modern Stroviki.

References

Populated places in ancient Boeotia
Former populated places in Greece